Morning service (a worship that is held in the morning) may refer to:

 Shacharit in Judaism
 Fajr, prayer in Islam
 Utrenja, a Polish liturgical composition
 Morning Prayer of the Anglican church
 In Wasei-eigo,breakfast special (:ja:モーニングサービス)